Vikramarjuna Vijaya (Kannada- ವಿಕ್ರಮಾರ್ಜುನ ವಿಜಯ) (victory of the mighty Arjuna), also known as Pampa Bharatha  is a classic work of the 10th century Jain poet Pampa (902–975 AD). It is a Kannada version of the great epic, the Mahabharata of Vyasa. Pampa choose the Arjuna, the central figure of the Pandava Clan, as the hero of his epic. This work differs from Mahabharata in several aspects, one of them being Arjuna crowned the king, subhadra the queen, after Kurukshetra war, instead of Yudhishthira, and Draupadi respectively.

A court poet of Chalukya king Arikesari II, a Rashtrakuta feudatory, he is most known for his epics, Vikramarjuna Vijaya (Pampa Bharata) and Adipurana, both written in Champu style, which he created and served as the model for all future works in Kannada. The works of Jain writers Adikavi Pampa, Sri Ponna and Ranna, collectively called the "three gems of Kannada literature", heralded the age of classical Kannada in the 10th century, the Medieval Kannada literature.

History
Vikramarjuna Vijaya is a 10th-century work of Adikavi Pampa.

Content
This work is not an abridged version of Vyasa's Mahabharata, but, rather, a recreation of the original in the cultural context of Karnataka and the religious context of Jainism. The relatively less dominant and slightly Machiavellian role given to Krishna is a major change.

Pampa was the court poet of Chalukya King Arikesari, a Rashtrakuta feudatory. The work acquires a historical significance because of the equation made by the poet between Arjuna and Arikesari his patron king belonging to the Ganga dynasty. This work was trendsetting in Kannada both in terms of subject and the form.

See also
 Western Chalukya literature in Kannada
 Adi Purana
original Text- Pamp Bharat- with word by word meaning : ಪಂಪಭಾರತ

Notes

Sources
 

Works based on the Mahabharata
10th-century Indian books
Jain texts
Western Chalukya Empire
Epic poems in Kannada